Richard Fanshawe may refer to:

Sir Richard Fanshawe, 1st Baronet (1608–1666), English diplomat, translator, and poet
Richard Fanshawe (equestrian) (1906–1988), British Olympic horse rider
Sir Richard Fanshawe, 2nd Baronet (1665-1694), of the Fanshawe baronets

See also
Fanshawe (surname)